The First National Bank in Mayville, North Dakota was built in 1889.  It was listed on the National Register of Historic Places in 19.

It is argued to be significant "because it was the first bank to be built in Mayville, North Dakota. It exhibits significant
distinctive architectural style and is a landmark building in the commercial district. The bank represents an early banking endeavor in
Mayville and is associated with several prominent Mayville entrepreneurs."

References

Victorian architecture in North Dakota
Commercial buildings completed in 1889
Bank buildings on the National Register of Historic Places in North Dakota
National Register of Historic Places in Traill County, North Dakota
1889 establishments in North Dakota
Mayville, North Dakota